, or NTUT, is a national university in Tsukuba, Ibaraki, Japan. The predecessor of the school was founded in 1987, and it was chartered as a university in 2005.　It is Japan's only national university that is focused on the education of students with special needs, including hearing impaired/deaf and visually impaired/blind students.

The school has several special needs programs:
Special Needs Education for the Visually Impaired
PreK - advanced vocational
Special Needs Education for the Deaf
PreK - advanced vocational
Special Needs Education for the Mentally Challenged
PreK - advanced vocational
Special Needs Education for the Physically Challenged
elementary - advanced vocational
Special Needs Education for the Children with Autism
preschool and elementary

References

External links

 Official website

Educational institutions established in 1987
School Corporations in Japan
Japanese national universities
Universities and colleges in Ibaraki Prefecture
1987 establishments in Japan
Tsukuba, Ibaraki